Stylidium androsaceum is an invalid species name that can refer to:

Stylidium calcaratum R.Br. var calcaratum, published as S. androsaceum Lindl. in early December 1839
Stylidium ericksoniae J.H.Willis, published as S. androsaceum O.Schwarz (nom. illeg.) in 1927
Stylidium guttatum R.Br., published as S. androsaceum DC. (nom. illeg.) in late December 1839

References

Stylidium by synonymy